Punigluconin is an ellagitannin, a polyphenol compound. It is found in the bark of Punica granatum (pomegranate) and in Emblica officinalis. It is a molecule having a hexahydroxydiphenic acid group and two gallic acids attached to a gluconic acid core.

References 

Pomegranate ellagitannins